Calum Randle (born 18 January 2000) is a Franco-British rugby union player who plays as winger with Montpellier HR.

Biography 
Calum Randle began playing rugby at Gloucester when he was 7. When he was 13, he and his parents moved to Marseillette in France. He made his professional debut with MHR in the European Champions Cup at Gloucester, against his former club. He competed for England at the 2022 Rugby World Cup Sevens in Cape Town.

References

External links 

 
 Calum Randle on allrugby.com

2000 births
Living people
Rugby union players from Cheltenham
French rugby union players
French rugby sevens players
English rugby union players
English emigrants to France
Rugby union fullbacks
Rugby union wings
Montpellier Hérault Rugby players
Rugby sevens players at the 2018 Summer Youth Olympics